Admiral George James Perceval, 6th Earl of Egmont (14 March 1794 – 2 August 1874), known as the Lord Arden between 1840 and 1841, was a British naval commander and Tory politician.

Background
Egmont was the third but eldest surviving son of Charles Perceval, 2nd Baron Arden, eldest son of John Perceval, 2nd Earl of Egmont, by his second wife Catherine, Baroness Arden. Prime Minister Spencer Perceval was his uncle.

Naval career
Egmont left Harrow school and was commissioned into the Royal Navy as a powder monkey in August 1805 and fought in HMS Orion in the Battle of Trafalgar the same year, aged eleven. During the Bombardment of Algiers in 1816 he commanded HMS Infernal. He was promoted to rear-admiral on 27 August 1851, to vice-admiral in 1857 and to admiral in 1863.

Political career
Egmont was returned to Parliament as one of two representatives for Surrey West in 1837, a seat he held until 1840. The latter year he succeeded his father in the barony of Arden and entered the House of Lords. The following year he also succeeded his half-first cousin once removed, Henry, as sixth Earl of Egmont.

The wills of the 4th and 5th Earls of Egmont were not proven until 1857, after the death of the family solicitor Sir Edward Tierney, by Tierney's son-in-law Sir William Darell. The 6th Earl contested the 5th Earl's will in 1863, on the grounds that Tierney had taken advantage of the 5th Earl's drunkenness to provide a misleading valuation of the estates which influenced the drafting of the will. The 6th Earl ultimately settled out of court with Darell, paying £125,000 for the return of the family estates in Churchtown, County Cork; Tierney and his heirs had realized an estimated £300,000 for their stewardship.

Family and parting assets
Lord Egmont married Jane, daughter of John Hornby, in 1819. They had no children. Lady Egmont died in October 1870. He survived his wife by four years and died in August 1874, aged 80. He was succeeded in the earldom by his nephew, Charles.

See also

References

New York Times obituary

External links 
 

1794 births
1874 deaths
People educated at Harrow School
Conservative Party (UK) MPs for English constituencies
UK MPs 1837–1841
Egmont, E6
Earls of Egmont
2
Younger sons of barons
Royal Navy admirals
Royal Navy personnel of the Napoleonic Wars
Royal Navy personnel of the Bombardment of Algiers (1816)